Larsen & Toubro Ltd, commonly known as L&T, is an Indian multinational conglomerate company, with business interests in engineering, construction, manufacturing, technology, information technology and financial services, headquartered in Mumbai. The company is counted among world's top five construction companies. It was founded by Henning Holck-Larsen and Søren Kristian Toubro, who were two Danish engineers taking refuge in India.

As of 2020, L&T Group comprises 118 subsidiaries, 6 associates, 25 joint-venture and 35 joint operations companies, operating across basic and heavy engineering, construction, realty, manufacturing of capital goods, information technology, and financial services.

History
Larsen & Toubro originated from a company founded in 1946 in Bombay by two Danish engineers, Henning Holck-Larsen and Søren Kristian Toubro. The company began as a representative of Danish manufacturers of dairy and allied equipment. However, with the start of the Second World War in 1939 and the resulting blockade of trade lines, the partners started a small workshop to undertake jobs and provide service facilities. Germany's invasion of Denmark in 1940 stopped supplies of Danish products. The war-time need to repair and refit and degauss ships offered L&T an opportunity, and led to the formation of a new company, Hilda Ltd, to handle these operations. L&T also started to repair and fabricate ships signalling the expansion of the company. The sudden internment of German engineers in British India (due to suspicions caused by the Second World War), who were to put up a soda ash plant for the Tatas, gave L&T a chance to enter the field of installation.

In 1946, ECC (Engineering Construction & Contracts) was incorporated by the partners; the company at this time was focused on construction projects (Presently, ECC is the construction division of L&T). L&T began several foreign collaborations. By 1947, the company represented British manufacturers of equipment used to manufacture products such as hydrogenated oils, biscuits, soaps and glass. In 1947, the company signed an agreement with Caterpillar Tractor Company, USA, for marketing earth moving equipment. At the end of the war, large numbers of war-surplus Caterpillar equipments were available at attractive prices, but the finances required were beyond the capacity of the partners. This prompted them to raise additional equity capital, and on 7 February 1946, Larsen & Toubro Private Limited was incorporated.

After India's independence in 1947, the firm set up offices in Calcutta (now Kolkata), Madras (now Chennai) and New Delhi. In 1948, 55 acres of undeveloped marsh and jungle was acquired in Powai, Mumbai. In 1956, a major part of the company's Mumbai office moved to ICI House in Ballard Estate, which would later be purchased by the company and renamed as L&T House, its present headquarters.

During the 1960s, ventures included UTMAL (set up in 1960), Audco India Limited (1961), Eutectic Welding Alloys (1962) and TENGL (1963).

In 1965, the firm had been chosen as a partner for building nuclear reactors. Dr. Homi Bhabha, then chairman of the Atomic Energy Commission (AEC) had in fact first approached L&T in the 1950s to fabricate critical components for atomic reactors. He convinced Holck-Larsen, a friend with whom he shared an interest in the arts that the company could do it, indeed must do it. L&T has since contributed significantly to the Indian nuclear programme ... Holck-Larsen was once asked by a junior engineer why L&T should get into building nuclear power plants when companies in the US and Germany were losing money on nuclear jobs.  He replied: 'Young man, India has to build nuclear power plants. If not L&T, who will do it?' 

During the 1970s, L&T was contracted to work with Indian Space Research Organisation (ISRO). Its then chairman, Vikram Sarabhai, chose L&T as manufacturing partner. In 1972, when India launched its space programme, the firm was invited to participate.

In 1976, ECC bid for a large airport project in Abu Dhabi. ECC's balance sheet, however, did not meet the bid's financial qualification requirement. So it was merged into L&T. ECC was eventually rechristened L&T Construction and now accounts for the largest slice of the group's annual revenue.

In 1985, L&T entered into a partnership with Defence Research and Development Organisation (DRDO). L&T was not yet allowed by the government to manufacture defence equipment but was permitted to participate in design and development programmes with DRDO. After the design and development was done,the firm had to hand over all the drawings to DRDO. The government would then assign the production work to a public sector defence unit or ordnance factory for manufacture. After a series of successes and positive policy initiatives, the firm today makes a range of weapon and missile systems, command and control systems, engineering systems and submarines through DRDO.

Structure 
Three key products/services which L&T is engaged in are: Construction and project-related activity; manufacturing and trading activity; and engineering services. L&T sold L&T Mutual Fund to HSBC on November 26, 2022. L&T IDPL was sold to Edelweiss Alternatives for Rs. 6,000 crore.
For administrative purposes, the conglomerate has been structured into sixteen subsidiary companies:

 L & T Construction
 L & T Hydrocarbon
 L & T Power
 L & T Mineral & Metals
 L & T Heavy Engineering
 L & T Defence
 L & T Shipbuilding
 L & T Construction & Mining Machinery
 L & T Valves
 L & T Technology Services
 L & T Metro Rail
 L & T Financial Services
 L & T Realty
 L & T SuFin
 L & T EduTech
 L & T Infotech

Major subsidiaries

Construction
L&T Construction is among the world's top 15 contractors. The business involves the construction of Buildings & Factories, Heavy Civil Infrastructure, Transportation Infrastructure, Power transmission & Distribution Infrastructure, Water & Effluent Treatment plants, Metallurgical & Material Handling Infrastructure and Smart World & Communication Infrastructure.

Buildings & Factories
L&T's buildings and factories (B&F) business undertakes construction projects such as commercial buildings and airports, residential buildings, and factories. Its track record includes, 400 high-rise towers, 11 airports, 53 IT parks, 17 automobile plants, 28 cement plants and 45 hospitals.  L&T offered to oversee the design and construction of Ram Mandir, Ayodhya free of cost and is the contractor of the project.

Heavy Civil Infrastructure
L&T's Heavy Civil Infrastructure (HCI) business undertakes projects in the areas of hydel power, tunnels, nuclear power, special bridges, metros, ports, harbours and defence installations. Its track record includes 231 km of metro rail corridors, 19.5 km of monorail corridors, 8,315 MW of hydropower projects and 8,080 MW of nuclear power projects. It has a subsidiary, L&T Geostructure LLP, and two JVs set up for metros in Doha and Saudi Arabia – ALYSI JV Gold Line Doha Metro and ArRiyadh New Mobility Consortium Riyadh Metro Orange Line.

Transportation Infrastructure
L&T's Transportation Infrastructure (TI) business undertakes projects such as roads, runways, elevated corridors, railways, etc. Its track record includes 13,500 lane km of highways, 7.49 million sq.m of runways and 3,260 tkm (track kilometre) of railway tracks. It also operates through subsidiaries such as L&T Oman LLC, L&T Infrastructure Engineering Ltd, and Hitech Rock Products & Aggregates Ltd.

Power Transmission and Distribution
L&T's Power Transmission and Distribution (PT&D) business undertakes projects involving the construction of substations, utility power distribution systems, transmission lines and optic fibre cabling projects. It executes projects in the renewables space, such as utility scale, microgrids and energy storage. It also operates in the Middle East, Africa and the ASEAN region. Its track record includes 12,510 tkm of railway electrification, 585 substations, 29,380 MW of E-BoP, and 20,600 ckm (circuit kilometre) of transmission lines.

Water & Effluent Treatment
L&T's Water & Effluent Treatment (WET) business undertakes projects involving water supply and distribution, wastewater treatment, industrial and large water systems and smart water infrastructure. Its track record includes 40,000 km of water and wastewater networks and 3,400 MLD (millions of litres per day) of water and wastewater treatment plants.

Minerals & Metals Strategic Business Group 
L&T also undertakes projects in the ferrous and non-ferrous sectors, i.e. iron and steel, aluminium, copper, zinc, lead and mineral beneficiation plants. It offers EPC solutions in bulk material handling for the coal sector. Its Industrial Machinery and Cast Products business offers fabrication, machining, assembly and casting products for industries such as chemical, cement, steel, paper, power, mineral and railways.

Renewable Energy - L&T Solar 
L&T develops concentrated solar power and solar photovoltaic technologies (grid-connected, rooftop and microgrid). It designs and builds solar power plants. L&T Solar, a subsidiary , undertakes solar energy projects. In April 2012, L&T commissioned India's largest solar photovoltaic power plant (40 MWp) owned by Reliance Power at Jaisalmer, Rajasthan from concept to commissioning in 129 days. In 2011, L&T entered into a partnership with Sharp for EPC (engineering, procurement and construction) in megawatt solar project and plan to construct about 100 MW in the next 12 months in most of the metros. L&T Infra Finance, promoted by the parent L&T Ltd, is also active in the funding of solar projects in India. It is governed by Rebel Enterprises.

EPC Projects 
L&T undertakes projects on an engineering, procurement and construction basis. Installation is often part of the package. This includes hydrocarbon engineering, power and power development.

Hydrocarbon Engineering 
A wholly owned subsidiary, L&T Hydocarbon Engineering Limited, provides engineering, procurement, fabrication, construction, installation and project management services for onshore and offshore hydrocarbon projects worldwide. 

L&T formed a venture with SapuraCrest Petroleum Berhad, Malaysia for providing services to the offshore construction industry. The joint venture owns and operates the LTS 3000, a crane vessel for heavy lifting and pipe-laying.

L&T Power 
L&T Power has set up an organisation focused on coal-based, gas-based and nuclear power projects. L&T has formed two joint ventures with Mitsubishi Heavy Industries, Japan to manufacture super critical boilers and steam turbine generators. L&T-MHPS Turbine Generators Private Limited (formerly known as L&T-MHI Turbine Generators Private Limited) is a Joint Venture Company formed in 2007 in India between Larsen & Toubro Limited (L&T), India, Mitsubishi Hitachi Power Systems (MHPS) and Mitsubishi Electric Corporation (MELCO), headquartered in Tokyo, Japan for manufacture of super-critical Turbines & Generators. L&T-MHPS Boilers Private Limited (formerly known as L&T-MHI Boilers Private Limited) is a 51:49 Joint Venture Company formed on 16 April 2007 in India between Larsen & Toubro Limited (L&T), India and Mitsubishi Hitachi Power Systems (MHPS), Japan for engaging in the business of design, engineering, manufacturing, selling, maintenance and servicing of Supercritical Boilers and Pulverisers in India.

The design wing of L&T ECC is EDRC (Engineering Design and Research Centre), which provides consultancy, design, and services. It carries out the basic and detailed design for both residential and commercial projects.

Manufacturing 
This subdivision includes Defence equipment & systems, Heavy Engineering, Construction, Mining & Industrial Machinery, Industrial Valves and Electrical & Automation Systems.

Defence & Aerospace 
L&T is one of India's largest developers and suppliers of defence equipment and systems, with over 30 years of experience in this space. It offers design-to-delivery solutions for land, sea and air defence. The company also offers specialised turnkey defence construction services, infrastructure and modernization of facilities. L&T's Aerospace business manufactures equipment and systems for the aviation and space industry, and has contributed to ISRO's Chandrayaan-2 and Mars Orbiter missions.

Heavy Engineering 
L&T is among the five largest fabrication companies in the world. L&T has a shipyard capable of constructing vessels of up to 150 metre long and displacement of 20,000 tons at its heavy engineering complexes at Hazira and Ranoli, Gujarat. The shipyard constructs specialised heavy-lift ships, CNG carriers, chemical tankers, defence & para-military vessels, submarines and other role-specific vessels.

L&T Realty 
 
L&T Realty is the real estate development arm of Larsen & Toubro. The company operates in Western and Southern India, constructing residential, corporate office, retail, leisure and entertainment properties with 35 million sq ft under various stages of development.

Machinery and industrial products
L&T manufactures, markets and provides service support for construction and mining machinery, including surface miners, hydraulic excavators, aggregate crushers, loader backhoes and vibratory compactors; supplies rubber processing machinery and manufactures and markets industrial valves and allied products along with application-engineered welding alloys.

L&T Metro Rail Hyderabad Limited 
The company is a subsidiary of L&T Infrastructure Development Projects Ltd., an infrastructure development arm of Larsen & Toubro Ltd.

Larsen and Toubro Limited was awarded the Hyderabad Metro Rail Project by Government of Telangana. L&T incorporated a Special Purpose Vehicle - L&T Metro Rail (Hyderabad) Limited ("The Company") to implement the Project on Design, Built, Finance Operate and Transfer (DBFOT) basis. The company has signed the Concession Agreement with Government of Andhra Pradesh on 4 September 2010 and completed the financial closure for the Project on 1 March 2011 in record six months. A consortium of 10 banks led by the State Bank of India has provided funding,  the largest fund tie-up in India for a non-power infrastructure Public- Private Partnership (PPP) project.
 
The company has commenced work on the Rs. 5,273 Crore Mumbai Metro Line 3 project. It consists of two packages: Package 1(Cuffe Parade-VidhanBhavan-Churchgate-Hutatma Chowk) and Package 7 (Marol Naka-MIDC-SEEPZ). It is also engaged in major metro rail projects in the Middle-East.

Other subsidiaries and joint ventures

As of March 2018, L&T has 93 subsidiaries, 8 associate companies, 34 joint ventures, and 33 joint operation companies.
L&T Infrastructure Engineering Ltd. is one of India's engineering consulting firms offering technical services in transport infrastructure. The company has experience both in India and Globally, delivering single point 'Concept to Commissioning' consulting services for infrastructure projects like airports, roads, bridges, ports and maritime structure including environment, transport planning and other related services. Established in 1990 as L&T-Rambøll Consulting Engineers Limited, the company became the wholly owned subsidiary of L&T in September 2014. Today, L&T Infra Engineering is an independent corporate entity managed by a board of directors. The company enjoys complete freedom to set and pursue its goals, drawing, as and when required, on the technical and managerial resources of L&T Infrastructure Engineering Limited.
L&T – Construction Equipment Limited: having its registered office at Mumbai, India and focusing on construction equipment and mining equipment, L&T-Komatsu Limited was a joint-venture of Larsen and Toubro, and Komatsu Asia Pacific Pte Limited, Singapore, a wholly owned subsidiary of Komatsu Limited, Japan. Komatsu is the world's second largest manufacturer of hydraulic excavators and has manufacturing and marketing facilities. The plant was started in 1975 by L&T to manufacture hydraulic excavators for the first time in India. In 1998, it became a joint-venture. The Bengaluru works comprise machinery and hydraulics works, with a manufacturing facility for design, manufacture, and servicing of earth moving equipment. The hydraulics works have a precision machine shop, manufacturing high-pressure hydraulic components and systems, and designing, developing, manufacturing and servicing hydraulic pumps, motors, cylinders, turning joints, hose assemblies, valve blocks, hydraulic systems, and power drives as well as allied gearboxes. In April 2013, L&T bought the 50% stake held by Komatsu Asia & Pacific. The company's name was changed to L&T Construction Equipment Limited.
 L&T has a joint venture with Qatari company Al Balagh group as the main contractors for the Al Rayyan stadium, the 2022 FIFA World Cup stadium which will host matches up to the quarter-final.
 L&T Finance: Larsen & Toubro financial services is a subsidiary which was incorporated as a non-banking financial company in November 1994. The subsidiary has financial products and services for corporate, construction equipments. This became a division in 2011 after the company declared its restructuring. A partnership between L&T Finance and Sonalika Group farm equipment maker International Tractors Ltd in April 2014 provided credit and financing to customers of Sonalika Group in India.
L&T Mutual Fund is the mutual fund company of the L&T Group. Its average assets under management (AuM) as of May 2019 is  73,936.68 crore.
 Larsen & Toubro Infrastructure Finance: this wholly owned subsidiary commenced business in January 2007 upon obtaining Non-Banking Financial Company (NBFC) license from the Reserve Bank of India (RBI). As of 31 March 2008, L&T Infrastructure Finance had approved financing of more than US$1 billion to select projects in the infrastructure sector. It received the status of "Infrastructure Finance Company" from the RBI within the overall classification of "Non-Banking Financial Company".
L&T Valves markets valves manufactured by L&T's Valve Manufacturing Unit and L&T's joint-venture Larsen & Toubro Valves Manufacturing Unit, Coimbatore as well as allied products other manufacturers. The group's manufacturing unit in Coimbatore manufactures industrial valves for the power industry, along with flow control valves for the oil and gas, refining, petrochemical, chemical and power industries, industrial valves and customised products for refinery, LNG, GTL, petrochemical and power projects. L&T Valves Business Group has offices in the US, South Africa, Dubai, Abu Dhabi, India and China, and alliances with valve distributors and agents in these countries.
L&T-MHPS Boilers is a joint venture between L&T and Mitsubishi Hitachi Power Systems. The group specialises in engineering, manufacturing, erecting and commissioning of supercritical steam generators used in power plants. It is mainly headquartered in Faridabad with a manufacturing facility in Hazira and an engineering centre in Chennai and Faridabad. Currently, the group is engaged in projects for JVPL, MAHAGENCO, Nabha Power & RRVUNL.
L&T MHPS Turbine Generators Pvt Ltd: in 2007, Larsen & Toubro and Mitsubishi Heavy Industries set up a joint-venture manufacturing agreement to supply a supercritical steam turbine and generator facility in Hazira. This followed a technology licensing and technical assistance agreement for the manufacture of supercritical turbines and generators between L&T, MHI, and Mitsubishi Electric Corporation (MELCO), headquartered in Tokyo, Japan. In February 2014, MHI and Hitachi Ltd integrated the business centred on thermal power generation systems (gas turbines, steam turbines, coal gasification generating equipment, boilers, thermal power control systems, generators, fuel cells, environmental equipment and so on) and started a new company as Mitsubishi Hitachi Power Systems (MHPS) Ltd, headquartered in Yokohama, Japan.
 L&T Howden Pvt Ltd is a joint venture between L&T and Howden to manufacture axial fans and air pre-heaters in the range of 120-1200 MW to thermal power stations. L&T Howden is an ISO 9001 and ISO 5001 certified organisation, with a plant located in Surat Hazira and a marketing office in Faridabad.
 L&T Special Steels and Heavy Forgings Pvt Ltd. is a joint venture between L&T and NPCIL, headquartered at Hazira. It is the largest integrated steel plant and heavy forging unit in India, capable of producing forgings weighing 120 MT each. LTSSHF currently is engaged in projects from the nuclear, hydrocarbon, power and oil and gas sectors.
 L&T-Sargent & Lundy Limited (L&T-S&L), established in 1995, is an engineering and consultancy firm in the power sector, formed by L&T and Sargent & Lundy L.L.C. - USA, a global consulting firm in the power industry since 1891
 In 2015, the company began developing commercial, retail and office space around the Hyderabad Metro Rail project.
 In June 2019, the company acquired a controlling stake in IT services company Mindtree Ltd

Technology Cluster

L&T Technology Services

L&T Technology Services, a subsidiary of Larsen & Toubro, is an engineering services company that operates in the global Engineering, Research and Development ("ER&D") space.  L&T Technology Services offers design, development and testing services for the industrial products, medical devices, transportation, aerospace, telecom and process industries.
The company serves customers across the product engineering life cycle from product conceptualization to implementation. Services include consulting, design, development, testing, maintenance, and to-market integration services. L&T Technology hits the Indian Capital Markets with its IPO offering 10.4 million shares at a price band of Rs.850 to Rs.860

L&T Technology Services, a subsidiary of Larsen & Toubro, is a global engineering services company headquartered out of Vadodara, Gujarat, India. It offers design, development, and testing solutions across the product and plant engineering value chain, for various domains including Industrial Products, Transportation, Aerospace, Telecom & Hi-tech, and the Process Industries. As of 2016, L&T Technology Services employs over 10,000 workers and has operations in 35 locations around the world. Its clientele includes a large number of Fortune 500 companies globally.

Larsen & Toubro Infotech (LTI)

Larsen & Toubro Infotech Limited, a listed subsidiary, owned 74% by L&T, offers information technology, software and services with a focus on manufacturing, BFSI and communications and embedded systems. It also provides services for embedded intelligence and engineering.

L&T Smart World & Communication 
L&T's Smart World & Communication business vertical is designed to provide end-to-end solutions as a master systems integrator in security solutions for critical infrastructure: ports, airports, metros, IT Parks and public buildings. It has built one of the largest surveillance projects comprising 6000 cameras across 1500 locations in Mumbai, and city surveillance and Intelligent Traffic Management Systems in Ahmedabad, Gandhinagar and Vadodara. In Jaipur, India's first smart city, L&T provided smart solutions like wi-fi hotspots, citizen information systems and surveillance cameras.

L&T-NxT 
In 2019 L&T announced a new initiative, L&T-Nxt, to focus on new-age technologies like artificial intelligence and cybersecurity. L&T-Nxt will focus on the areas of artificial intelligence, internet of things (IoT), virtual reality, augmented reality, geospatial solutions as well as cybersecurity and leverage the experience that L&T has garnered over the decades.   L&T-NxT is based on the strength and experience of L&T.

Mindtree 

In 2019 L&T gained a controlling stake in Mindtree, a global technology consulting and services company with a share of 60 per cent. The takeover of Mindtree was, at the time, referred to as the first-ever hostile takeover in the Indian IT industry.

International Markets 
L&T sharpened its focus on international markets, especially the Gulf, from 2010 onwards. Since then, from under one-tenth, international business now contributes around one-third to both order inflow and revenue. L&T has set up a full range of operations in the Middle East catering to the Gulf and North Africa. Many of the projects are being undertaken through joint ventures with leading companies based in the Gulf. L&T provides turnkey solutions across key regions: the Middle East (UAE, Qatar, Kuwait, Oman, Saudi Arabia and Bahrain), Africa (Algeria, Kenya, Ethiopia and Malawi) and ASEAN (Malaysia and Thailand). The range of work is wide and varied: high-voltage substations, power transmission lines, extra-high-voltage cabling and instrumentation and control systems.

Divestments 
L&T has across the decades exited from several businesses. These include:

Cement 
L&T sold its 16.5 million tonne/per year capacity cement division to UltraTech Cement and also divested its 8.5% stake in A V Birla group company Grasim Industries in 2004.

L&T-John Deere 
In 1992, L&T established a 50-50 joint venture with John Deere to manufacture tractors in India, called L&T - John Deere.  L&T sold their interest to John Deere in 2005.

L&T Case 
In 1992, L&T established L&T-Case Construction with CNH Global as a 50-50 joint venture to build backhoes. In 2011, L&T   sold its share to CNH, and the company was renamed Case New Holland Construction Equipment India.

L&T Medical Equipment and Systems 
's medical equipment division, known as L&T Medical Equipment & Systems, was established in 1987. In November 2012, L&T sold it to Skanray Technologies Pvt Ltd. Currently, L&T Mysore division manufactures Single-phase and Three-phase static solid-state Electricity Meters to various utilities in India. The range of meters varies from residential, industrial, prepayment and smart meters. there are both whole current and CT operated meters. It also houses a relay servicing unit.

EWAC Alloys Limited 
EWAC Alloys Limited was a wholly owned subsidiary of L&T. The company was engaged in design & development, manufacture and supply of special welding electrodes, gas brazing rods and fluxes, welding torches and accessories, atomised metal powder alloys, flux cored continuous wires & wire feeders, polymer compounds & wear-resistant plates.

Prof Wasserman, founder of Eutectic Castolin, and Henning Hock Larsen, founder of L&T, founded the Eutectic Division in India in the year 1962. Eutectic Castolin was later merged into the Messer Group of companies, Germany and referred as Messer Eutectic Castolin (MEC). In 2010, L&T, bought the entire stake from Messer to become the wholly owned subsidiary of it. The current headquarters is in Ankleshwar, Gujarat (India), and the products are sold under the name EWAC.

L&T sold its entire stake in unlisted subsidiary EWAC Alloys to UK-registered ESAB Holdings for a total consideration of Rs 522 crore. The share purchase agreement has been executed on 11 October 2017. The acquirer ESAB offers products for welding and cutting process. In 2012, ESAB was acquired by Colfax Corp., a diversified industrial manufacturing company based in the US.

L&T Kobelco Machinery Private Limited 
This was a joint venture of L&T and Kobe Steel of Japan, to manufacture internal mixers and twin screw roller-head extruder's for the tyre industry. L&T sold its entire 51% stake in L&T Kobelco Machinery Private to its joint venture partner in the company, Kobe Steel of Japan, for Rs 43.5 crore.

L&T Electrical and Automation Ltd. 
L&T was an international manufacturer of electrical and electronic products and systems. The company manufactured custom-engineered switchboards for industrial sectors like power, refineries, petrochemicals and cement. In the electronic segment, L&T offered a range of metres and provides control automation systems for industries. In May 2018, the firm signed a definitive agreement with Schneider Electric for the strategic divestment of its electrical and automation (E&A) business in an all-cash deal of ₹14,000 crore. The deal was completed on 31 August 2020 after receiving the requisite regulatory approvals. L&T has said that its exit from the electrical and automation business is a part of its strategic portfolio review process.

Listing and shareholding
The equity shares of the company are listed on the Bombay Stock Exchange (BSE) and the National Stock Exchange of India (NSE). The company's shares constitute a part of the BSE SENSEX of the BSE as well as the NIFTY 50 index of the NSE. Its global depository receipts (GDR) are listed on the Luxembourg Stock Exchange and London Stock Exchange.

Shareholders 
Shareholders as of 31 March 2020

Employees
As on 31 January 2022, the company had 55,332 permanent employees, out of which 2,822 were women (5.29%) and 90 were employees with disabilities (0.1012%). At the same period company had 293,662 employees on contract basis.

Awards and recognition
 L&T ranked 2nd in Top 25 EPC Contractors 2022 in the Middle East List by Oil & Gas Middle East
 L&T ranked 4th in the 2021 LinkedIn Top Companies list, India
In 2021, L&T won the Innovation in Onboarding at the OLX People HR Excellence awards by The Economic Times HRWorld
L&T Hydrocarbon won the  Federation of Indian Petroleum Industry (FIPI)  ‘Engineering Procurement Construction (EPC) - Company of the Year’ Award for 2020
In 1997, the Bengaluru Works division was awarded the "Best of all" Rajiv Gandhi National Quality Award
 In 2013, L&T Power received 'Golden Peacock National Quality Award – 2012' at the 23rd World Congress on 'Leadership & Quality of Governance'.
 L&T ranked at No.22 among World’s Best  Employers and No.1 in India by Forbes for 2018.

See also

 L&T Realty 
 List of companies of India
 List of oilfield service companies

References

External links
 

 
BSE SENSEX
NIFTY 50
Companies based in Mumbai
Construction and civil engineering companies of India
Engineering companies of India
Aerospace companies of India
Gas turbine manufacturers
Conglomerate companies established in 1938
Indian brands
Construction and civil engineering companies established in 1938
Construction equipment manufacturers of India
Indian companies established in 1938
Companies listed on the National Stock Exchange of India
Companies listed on the Bombay Stock Exchange
Defence companies of India
Indian companies established in 1946